Varnhem is a locality situated in Skara Municipality, Västra Götaland County, Sweden with 707 inhabitants in 2010.

Varnhem is the location of the oldest known stone church in Sweden outside of Scania, erected in the 1040s at the latest. It is also the location of a Christian cemetery which was in use during the end of the ninth century.

The Cistercian Order established Varnhem Abbey around 1150, not far from the old church. A new abbey church was erected to replace the older church; the abbey church is still in use.

Varnhem and in particular its abbey has received additional attention in recent years due to it being the main location of The Knight Templar trilogy written by Jan Guillou, and subsequently filmed. Arn Magnusson, the hero character of the series is portrayed as living there.

The statesman Birger Jarl (–1266) and his family lie buried in Varnhem.

The botanist Anders Dahl (1751–1789) was born in Varnhem.

References

External links 
Fullscreen Virtual Tour by Virtualsweden
Skara Tourist Office

Populated places in Västra Götaland County
Populated places in Skara Municipality
Skaraborg